Melhania integra is a plant in the mallow family Malvaceae, native to South Africa.

Description
Inflorescences are typically one to three-flowered and feature yellow petals. The species resembles Melhania randii but differs, for example, in its larger flowers.

Distribution and habitat
Melhania integra is native to South Africa's Northern Provinces. Its habitat is among rocks on grassy slopes.

References

integra
Flora of the Northern Provinces
Plants described in 1964